Maximilian "Max" Siedentopf (born 27 June 1991) is a Namibian-German artist, designer, publisher and director.  He is known for having set up an installation titled Toto Forever in the Namib Desert which consists of a ring of large white blocks atop of which sit six speakers attached to a solar-powered MP3 player configured to continuously play the 1982 song Africa by the American band Toto. The exact location of the installation has not been disclosed.

Early life 
Siedentopf grew up in the city of Windhoek in Namibia, and continues to work in Berlin, Los Angeles, Amsterdam, and London.  He is a former competitive swimmer.

Career 
In June 2019, Siedentopf starred in the music video for "Mine Right Now", a song by Norwegian singer Sigrid. This was due to Sigrid's flight being cancelled, the singer therefore being unable to appear in the video herself.

References

German artists
Namibian artists
Living people
People from Windhoek
1991 births